Jorge Roesler (22 August 1924 – 18 January 1975) was a Mexican rower. He competed in the men's single sculls event at the 1956 Summer Olympics.

References

External links
 

1924 births
1975 deaths
Mexican male rowers
Olympic rowers of Mexico
Rowers at the 1956 Summer Olympics
Rowers from Mexico City